Brigadier General Claud Edward Charles Graham Charlton   (25 August 1871 – 26 June 1961)  was a British Army officer and Deputy Lieutenant for Essex.

Life and career
Charlton was the son of Lieutenant Colonel Richard Granville Charlton. He was educated at Royal Military Academy, Woolwich.

He served in the Tirah Campaign of 1897-98 and in the Sudan in 1902.

In 1906, he married Gwendoline, daughter of Arthur Whitaker of Cadogan Square, London.

During his career he served with the Royal Horse Artillery and Royal Field Artillery. In the First World War, he was mentioned in despatches and was awarded the Belgian Croix de Guerre. From 1920 to 1923, he commanded West Lancashire Division of the Royal Artillery (Territorial Army) and was Military Attaché at the British Embassy in Washington D.C. from 1923 to 1927.

From 1928, he lived at Great Canfield Park in Takeley, Essex. He was a Deputy Lieutenant for Essex and High Sheriff of that county for 1947–48.

Honours
 Tirah Campaign Medal (with two clasps), 1897–98
 Sudan Campaign Medal (with clasp), 1902
 Companion of the Distinguished Service Order, 1917
 Companion of St.Michael and St. George, 1919
 Companion of the Bath (Military), 1924
 Belgian Croix de Guerre
 Order of Osminieh (3rd class)
 Order of the Medjidie (4th class)
 Defence Medal

References

Hankinson, C. F. J. (ed.), Debrett's Baronetage, Knightage and Companionage, 1954, Odhams Press, 1954

1871 births
1961 deaths
Graduates of the Royal Military Academy, Woolwich
British Army brigadiers
Companions of the Order of St Michael and St George
Companions of the Order of the Bath
Companions of the Distinguished Service Order
British Army personnel of World War I
British military personnel of the Tirah campaign
British diplomats
Royal Artillery officers
Deputy Lieutenants of Essex
High Sheriffs of Essex
Recipients of the Croix de guerre (Belgium)
Recipients of the Order of the Medjidie, 4th class
People from Takeley